Hasan Al (born 18 June 1972 in Sivas, Sivas Province) is a Turkish-born boxer from Denmark, best known for winning the European welterweight title in 1996 as an amateur.

Career
In his adopted country he became European Champ in 1996 against Marian Simion. At the Olympics 1996 he defeated Sergiy Dzindziruk then lost to Simion.

Al turned professional at middleweight in 1996 but was not successful. He beat Meldrick Taylor on points in 1998. In 2001, he first drew then was outpointed in a rematch by Carlos Baldomir in his only loss. He retired in 2004.

References

External links
Euro 1996
Olympics 1996

1972 births
Living people
People from Sivas
Danish male boxers
Welterweight boxers
Turkish emigrants to Denmark
Olympic boxers of Denmark
Boxers at the 1996 Summer Olympics